Ctenucha mortia is a moth of the family Erebidae. It is found in Paraguay.

References

mortia
Moths described in 1901